José María Olazábal Manterola (born 5 February 1966) is a Spanish professional golfer from the Basque region who has enjoyed success on both the European Tour and the PGA Tour, and has won two major championships, both at The Masters.

In 2012 he captained Europe's Ryder Cup team to a narrow victory over the US, which seemed improbable at the start of the final day's play when the Europeans trailed 10–6. They came back to win 14½–13½.

Early life
Olazábal was born in Hondarribia, a town in the Basque autonomous region of Spain, the day after the golf course Real Golf Club de San Sebastian opened next to his family's home. His father Gaspar succeeded his grandfather as greenskeeper at the golf club, where his mother also worked. Olazábal began to hit golf balls at age 2 with a shortened club, and at age 6 he could practice on the course in late afternoons.

Amateur career
As an amateur, he represented Spain on all levels. He represented Spain in competing in the Eisenhower Trophy at 16 years of age in 1982, and again two years later, in 1984.

In 1983, he won the Boys Amateur Championship at Glenbervie Golf Club, Scotland, and in 1984, he won The Amateur Championship at Formby Golf Club, Liverpool, England, at age 18, beating Colin Montgomerie 5 and 4 in the final. The year after, when he won the British Youths Open Amateur Championship, at Ganton Golf Club, England, he became the first player to have won the British Boy's, Youth's and Amateur titles in a career.

At the 1985 European Amateur Team Championship in Halmstad, Sweden, Olazabal made a hole-in-one at the 13th hole on his way to winning 3 and 2 against Colin Montgomerie in the semi final between Spain and Scotland. However, Scotland went on to win the team tournament.

The month before his British Youths title, Olazábal, finished tied 25th and low amateur at the 1985 Open Championship in tough conditions at Royal St George's Golf Club in Sandwich, England.

Professional career
In his rookie professional season of 1986, he finished second on the European Tour Order of Merit aged 20. In his first nine seasons, he finished in the top 10 every year except two, including another second place in 1989. He was unable to play in 1996 due to a foot injury but he recovered and recorded further top 10 placings in the Order of Merit in 1997, 1999 and 2000.

He has won 23 career titles on the European Tour, which is ninth best all-time.

He was in the world top 10 for over 300 weeks between 1989 and 1995. Had Olazábal beaten Ian Woosnam at the 1991 Masters Tournament (he finished second) he would have become the World No. 1.

In 1990, Olazábal made a, at the time, rare visit to the PGA Tour, invited in a limited field to the NEC World Series of Golf at Firestone Country Club in Akron, Ohio. He opened with a course record 61, continued with aggregate course and tournament records after every round and finished with an 18-under 262 total, 12 strokes ahead of second placed Lanny Wadkins. After congratulating Olazábal, Wadkins joked that he wished Olazábal back to Europe immediately.

Both of Olazábal's majors have come in the United States, namely The Masters in 1994 and 1999. These wins make him one of only two winners of the Amateur Championship since World War II to have gone on to win a professional major. He has been highly placed in The Masters on a number of other occasions. Olazábal shares the record for the lowest round in the PGA Championship (63), which he accomplished in the third round at Valhalla Golf Club in 2000.

In 2001, Olazábal began to play on the PGA Tour, while also retaining his membership of the European Tour. He had a solid year on the PGA Tour in 2002, when he won nearly $2 million and came 24th on the money list, but has not duplicated the success he enjoyed in Europe in the 1980s and 1990s. He has six career PGA Tour titles, five of them won before he became a full member of the Tour. In 2006, he made a return to the top 15 of the world rankings.

Olazábal was a member of Europe's Ryder Cup team seven times from 1987 to 2006. He formed a famous partnership with fellow Spaniard Seve Ballesteros that spanned many years, and formed a similarly successful partnership with Sergio García in 2006.

Olazábal captained the European team at the 2012 Ryder Cup for the defence of the trophy at Medinah Country Club in Illinois. After his team went down 10–4 during the second day and 10–6 going into the last day, he helped engineer the greatest ever Ryder Cup comeback with the European team eventually winning by 14½ points to 13½. Olazábal was very emotional with the win, saying in an interview that that was his number one happiest golf moment and happiest moment of his life. The win was inspired by his late friend Seve Ballesteros, to whom he dedicated the win. He confirmed afterwards that he would not consider himself for captaincy in the next Ryder Cup.

Olazábal holds the world record distance for a completed putt. During the 1999 European Ryder Cup team's Concorde flight to the United States, he holed a putt which travelled the full length of the cabin. The ball was in motion for 26.17s, during which time the Concorde, at 1,270 mph, traveled 9.232 miles, beating U.S. golfer Brad Faxon's previous record of 8.5 miles, set in 1997.

Olazábal was elected to the World Golf Hall of Fame in 2009 with 56% of the vote on the international ballot.

On 19 June 2013, Olazábal was presented with Spain's most prestigious sporting honor, the Prince of Asturias Award in recognition of his accomplishments as a player and leader of the 2012 Ryder Cup team. He is only the second golfer to be honored since the awards were launched in 1987; Seve Ballesteros was honored in 1989.

Amateur wins
1983 Italian Open Amateur Championship, Spanish Open Amateur Championship, Boys Amateur Championship
1984 The Amateur Championship, Belgian International Youths Championship, Spanish Open Amateur Championship
1985 British Youths Open Amateur Championship

Professional wins (30)

PGA Tour wins (6)

PGA Tour playoff record (0–2)

European Tour wins (23)

1Co-sanctioned by the Asian Tour

European Tour playoff record (2–2)

Japan Golf Tour wins (2)

*Note: The 1989 Visa Taiheiyo Club Masters was shortened to 54 holes due to rain.

Other wins (1)

Major championships

Wins (2)

Results timeline
Results not in chronological order in 2020.

LA = Low amateur
WD = Withdrew
CUT = missed the half-way cut
"T" indicates a tie for a place
NT = No tournament due to COVID-19 pandemic

Summary

Most consecutive cuts made – 9 (1994 Open Championship – 1997 Open Championship)
Longest streak of top-10s – 2 (twice)

Results in The Players Championship

CUT = missed the halfway cut
"T" indicates a tie for a place

Results in World Golf Championships

1Cancelled due to 9/11

QF, R16, R32, R64 = Round in which player lost in match play
"T" = Tied
NT = No tournament

Results in senior major championships
Results not in chronological order before 2022.

CUT = missed the halfway cut
"T" indicates a tie for a place
NT = No tournament due to COVID-19 pandemic

Team appearances
Amateur
Eisenhower Trophy (representing Spain): 1982, 1984
Jacques Léglise Trophy (representing the Continent of Europe): 1981, 1982, 1983
European Amateur Team Championship (representing Spain): 1983, 1985
European Youths' Team Championship (representing Spain): 1982, 1984
St Andrews Trophy (representing the Continent of Europe): 1984

Professional
Alfred Dunhill Cup (representing Spain): 1986, 1987, 1988, 1989, 1992, 1993, 1998, 1999 (winners), 2000 (winners)
Four Tours World Championship (representing Europe): 1987, 1989
Ryder Cup (representing Europe): 1987 (winners), 1989 (tied; retained trophy), 1991, 1993, 1997 (winners), 1999, 2006 (winners), 2012 (winners, non-playing captain)
World Cup (representing Spain): 1989, 2000
Seve Trophy (representing Continental Europe): 2000 (winners), 2002, 2003, 2005 (playing captain), 2013 (winners, non-playing captain)
Royal Trophy (representing Europe): 2009 (non-playing captain), 2012 (playing captain), 2013 (non-playing captain)

See also
List of golfers with most European Tour wins

References

External links

Golden Heart Award granted by  Spanish Heart Foundation

Spanish male golfers
Golfers from the Basque Country (autonomous community)
European Tour golfers
PGA Tour golfers
Winners of men's major golf championships
Ryder Cup competitors for Europe
World Golf Hall of Fame inductees
Sportspeople from Gipuzkoa
People from Hondarribia
1966 births
Living people